The Crowcamp Hills are a mountain range in Harney County, Oregon.
This mountain range is located at a latitude of 43.5249 and a longitude of 118.5024, locating this mountain range within the Drewsey CCD.

References 

Mountain ranges of Oregon
Mountain ranges of Harney County, Oregon